Victor Erroelen (23 December 1916 – 22 February 1988) was a Belgian footballer. He played in four matches for the Belgium national football team in 1948.

References

External links
 

1916 births
1988 deaths
Belgian footballers
Belgium international footballers
Place of birth missing
Association football midfielders